The 2008 Tohoku Rakuten Golden Eagles season was the fourth season of the Tohoku Rakuten Golden Eagles franchise. The Eagles played their home games at Miyagi Baseball Stadium in the city of Sendai as members of Nippon Professional Baseball's Pacific League. The team was led by Katsuya Nomura on his third season as team manager.

Regular season

Standings

Interleague

Record vs. opponents

Opening Day roster 
Thursday, March 20, 2008, at Fukuoka SoftBank Hawks

Game log

|-align="center" bgcolor="#ffbbbb"
| 1 || March 20 || @ Hawks || 3–4 || Kume (1–0) || Guzmán (0–1) || — || Yahoo Dome || 35,722 || 0–1–0 || L1
|-align="center" bgcolor="#ffbbbb"
| 2 || March 22 || @ Hawks || 4–5 (11) || Nitkowski (1–0) || Watanabe (0–1) || — || Yahoo Dome || 31,014 || 0–2–0 || L2
|-align="center" bgcolor="#ffbbbb"
| 3 || March 23 || @ Hawks || 0–4 || Oba (1–0) || Asai (0–1) || — || Yahoo Dome || 31,660 || 0–3–0 || L3
|-align="center" bgcolor="#ffbbbb"
| 4 || March 25 || @ Buffaloes || 4–5 || Takagi (1–0) || Ichiba (0–1) || Kato (3) || Kyocera Dome || 34,911 || 0–4–0 || L4
|-align="center" bgcolor="bbffbb"
| 5 || March 26 || @ Buffaloes || 11–0 || Nagai (1–0) || Mitsuhara (0–1) || — || Kyocera Dome || 11,052 || 1–4–0 || W1
|-align="center" bgcolor="bbffbb"
| 6 || March 27 || @ Buffaloes || 2–0 || Iwakuma (1–0) || Kaneko (1–1) || — || Kyocera Dome || 23,547 || 2–4–0 || W2
|-align="center" bgcolor="bbffbb"
| 7 || March 29 || Fighters || 7–2 || Tanaka (1–0) || Hoshino (0–1) || — || Kleenex Stadium || 20,189 || 3–4–0 || W3
|-align="center" bgcolor="bbffbb"
| 8 || March 30 || Fighters || 3–1 || Asai (1–1) || Glynn (0–2) || Aoyama (1) || Kleenex Stadium || 19,518 || 4–4–0 || W4
|-

|-align="center" bgcolor="bbffbb"
| 9 || April 1 || Marines ||  7–4 || Koyama (1–0) || Komiyama (0–2) || Aoyama (2) || Kleenex Stadium || 10,927 || 5–4–0 || W5
|-align="center" bgcolor="bbffbb"
| 10 || April 2 || Marines || 6–3 || Nagai (2–0) || Shimizu (0–2) || Aoyama (3) || Kleenex Stadium || 14,285 || 6–4–0 || W6
|-align="center" bgcolor="bbffbb"
| 11 || April 3 || Marines || 9–1 || Iwakuma (2–0) || Kubo (1–1) || — || Kleenex Stadium || 15,018 || 7–4–0 || W7
|-align="center" bgcolor="#ffbbbb"
| 12 || April 4 || @ Lions || 2–4 || Hoashi (1–0) || Lin (0–1) || Graman (2) || Shikishima Stadium || 17,599 || 7–5–0 || L1
|-align="center" bgcolor="#ffbbbb"
| 13 || April 5 || @ Lions || 2–4 || Ishii (3–0) || Tanaka (1–1) || Onuma (1) || Seibu Dome || 23,902 || 7–6–0 || L2
|-align="center" bgcolor="#ffbbbb"
| 14 || April 6 || @ Lions ||  3–4 || Kinney (2–1) || Asai (1–2) || Graman (3) || Seibu Dome || 18,213 || 7–7–0 || L3
|-align="center" bgcolor="#ffbbbb"
| 15 || April 8 || @ Fighters || 7–8 || Takeda (3–0) || Lin (0–1) || Nakamura (3) || Sapporo Dome || 20,257 || 7–8–0 || L4
|-align="center" bgcolor="#ffbbbb"
| 16 || April 9 || @ Fighters || 2–4 || Yoshikawa (1–2) || Nagai (2–1) || Nakamura (4) || Sapporo Dome || 19,044 || 7–9–0 || L5
|-align="center" bgcolor="#ffbbbb"
| 17 || April 10 || @ Fighters || 0–1 || Yu Darvish (3–0) || Iwakuma (2–1) || — || Sapporo Dome || 25,197 || 7–10–0 || L6
|-align="center" bgcolor="bbffbb"
| 18 || April 11 || Buffaloes || 5–4 (10) || Aoyama (1–0) || Yamaguchi (1–1) || — || Kleenex Stadium || 10,626 || 8–10–0 || W1
|-align="center" bgcolor="bbffbb"
| 19 || April 12 || Buffaloes || 3–0 || Tanaka (2–1) || Kondo (2–1) || — || Kleenex Stadium || 15,456 || 9–10–0 || W2
|-align="center" bgcolor="bbffbb"
| 20 || April 13 || Buffaloes || 12–6 || Asai (2–2) || Kawagoe (1–2) || — || Kleenex Stadium || 12,879 || 10–10–0 || W3
|-align="center" bgcolor="#ffbbbb"
| 21 || April 15 || @ Marines || 6–7 || Ono (1–0) || Nagai (2–2) || Ogino (4) || Chiba Marine Stadium || 17,336 || 10–11–0 || L1
|-align="center" bgcolor="#ffbbbb"
| 22 || April 16 || @ Marines || 1–2 || Shimizu (2–2) || Guzmán (0–2) || — || Chiba Marine Stadium || 16,853 || 10–12–0 || L2
|-align="center" bgcolor="bbffbb"
| 23 || April 17 || @ Marines || 11–2 || Iwakuma (3–1) || Kubo (1–3) || — || Chiba Marine Stadium || 9,211 || 11–12–0 || W1
|-align="center" bgcolor="#bbbbbb"
| — || April 19 || Lions || colspan=4|Postponed (rain) – Makeup date: October 4 || Kleenex Stadium || — || — || —
|-align="center" bgcolor="#ffbbbb"
| 24 || April 20 || Lions || 3–4 (10) || Iwasaki (1–0) || Aoyama (1–1) || Graman (6) || Kleenex Stadium || 19,601 || 11–13–0 || L1
|-align="center" bgcolor="bbffbb"
| 25 || April 22 || Hawks || 4–3 || Asai (3–2) || Powell (1–1) || Aoyama (4) || Kleenex Stadium || 11,799 || 12–13–0 || W1
|-align="center" bgcolor="bbffbb"
| 26 || April 23 || Hawks || 4–0 || Nagai (3–2) || Otonari (2–3) || — || Kleenex Stadium || 12,353 || 13–13–0 || W2
|-align="center" bgcolor="#bbbbbb"
| — || April 24 || Hawks || colspan=4|Postponed (rain) – Makeup date: September 30 || Kleenex Stadium || — || — || —
|-align="center" bgcolor="bbffbb"
| 27 || April 25 || Fighters || 6–1 || Iwakuma (4–1) || Yoshikawa (1–4) || — || Kleenex Stadium || 13,213 || 14–13–0 || W3
|-align="center" bgcolor="bbffbb"
| 28 || April 26 || Fighters || 6–1 || Guzmán (1–2) || Fujii (1–2) || — || Kleenex Stadium || 16,826 || 15–13–0 || W4
|-align="center" bgcolor="bbffbb"
| 29 || April 27 || Fighters || 5–0 || Tanaka (3–1) || Glynn (1–4) || — || Kleenex Stadium || 20,634 || 16–13–0 || W5
|-align="center" bgcolor="#ffbbbb"
| 30 || April 29 || @ Buffaloes || 1–2 || Yamaguchi (2–1) || Asai (3–3) || Kato (7) || Kyocera Dome || 18,571 || 16–14–0 || L1
|-align="center" bgcolor="bbffbb"
| 31 || April 30 || @ Buffaloes || 5–4 || Koyama (2–0) || Yamaguchi (2–2) || — || Kyocera Dome || 13,146 || 17–14–0 || W1
|-

|-align="center" bgcolor="#ffbbbb"
| 32 || May 1 || @ Buffaloes || 1–6 || Komatsu (3–0) || Ichiba (0–2) || — || Skymark Stadium || 14,003 || 17–15–0 || L1
|-align="center" bgcolor="#ffbbbb"
| 33 || May 2 || @ Fighters || 1–5 || Tadano (1–0) || Iwakuma (4–2) || Nakamura (9) || Sapporo Dome || 41,124 || 17–16–0 || L2
|-align="center" bgcolor="#ffbbbb"
| 34 || May 3 || @ Fighters || 5–12 || Sakamoto (1–1) || Kawagishi (0–1) || — || Sapporo Dome || 40,083 || 17–17–0 || L3
|-align="center" bgcolor="bbffbb"
| 35 || May 4 || @ Fighters || 7–1 || Tanaka (4–1) || Glynn (1–5) || — || Sapporo Dome || 42,126 || 18–17–0 || W1
|-align="center" bgcolor="#ffbbbb"
| 36 || May 5 || Hawks || 5–7 (11) || Ogura (4–1) || Koyama (2–1) || Yanase (1) || Kleenex Stadium || 20,572 || 18–18–0 || L1
|-align="center" bgcolor="#ffbbbb"
| 37 || May 6 || Hawks || 4–8 || Otonari (3–4) || Nagai (3–3) || — || Kleenex Stadium || 20,885 || 18–19–0 || L2
|-align="center" bgcolor="bbffbb"
| 38 || May 7 || Hawks || 9–7 || Asai (4–3) || Takeoka (0–1) || Arime (1) || Kleenex Stadium || 10,667 || 19–19–0 || W1
|-align="center" bgcolor="bbffbb"
| 39 || May 9 || @ Marines || 11–4 || Iwakuma (5–2) || Ono (2–2) || — || Chiba Marine Stadium || 16,849 || 20–19–0 || W2
|-align="center" bgcolor="#bbbbbb"
| — || May 10 || @ Marines || colspan=4|Postponed (rain) – Makeup date: September 19 || Chiba Marine Stadium || — || — || —
|-align="center" bgcolor="#ffbbbb"
| 40 || May 11 || @ Marines|| 1–6 || Shimizu (4–3) || Tanaka (4–2) || — || Chiba Marine Stadium || 24,892 || 20–20–0 || L1
|-align="center" bgcolor="#ffbbbb"
| 41 || May 13 || Buffaloes || 2–8 || Kondo (3–4) || Nagai (3–4) || — || Fukushima Azuma || 7,041 || 20–21–0 || L2
|-align="center" bgcolor="#bbbbbb"
| — || May 14 || Buffaloes || colspan=4|Postponed (rain) – Makeup date: September 4 || Kleenex Stadium || — || — || —
|-align="center" bgcolor="#ffbbbb"
| 42 || May 15 || Buffaloes || 1–2 || Komatsu (4–0) || Asai (4–4) || Kato (10) || Kleenex Stadium || 11,581 || 20–22–0 || L3
|-align="center" bgcolor="bbffbb"
| 43 || May 16 || Lions || 8–2 || Iwakuma (6–2) || Kishi (4–2) || — || Kleenex Stadium || 12,057 || 21–22–0 || W1
|-align="center" bgcolor="bbffbb"
| 44 || May 17 || Lions || 3–2 (12) || Kawagishi (1–1) || Okamoto (0–1) || — || Kleenex Stadium || 14,265 || 22–22–0 || W2
|-align="center" bgcolor="#ffbbbb"
| 45 || May 18 || Lions || 3–7 || Hsu (1–0) || Tanaka (4–3) || — || Kleenex Stadium || 20,253 || 22–23–0 || L1
|-align="center" bgcolor="bbffbb"
| 46 || May 20 || Dragons || 6–1 || Nagai (4–4) || Ogasawara (4–3) || — || Kleenex Stadium || 12,964 || 23–23–0 || W1
|-align="center" bgcolor="#ffbbbb
| 47 || May 21 || Dragons || 1–3 || Yamamoto (3–0) || Asai (4–5) || Iwase (13) || Kleenex Stadium || 15,372 || 23–24–0 || L1
|-align="center" bgcolor="bbffbb"
| 48 || May 23 || BayStars || 7–5 || Iwakuma (7–2) || Kobayashi (1–1) || Koyama (1) || Kleenex Stadium || 14,091 || 24–24–0 || W1
|-align="center" bgcolor="bbffbb"
| 49 || May 24 || BayStars || 2–1 || Guzmán (2–2) || Oyamada (1–2) || Koyama (2) || Kleenex Stadium || 17,435 || 25–24–0 || W2
|-align="center" bgcolor="bbffbb"
| 50 || May 25 || @ Swallows || 10–2 || Tanaka (5–3) || Kamada (0–1) || — || Meiji Jingu Stadium || 22,491 || 26–24–0 || W3
|-align="center" bgcolor="bbffbb"
| 51 || May 26 || @ Swallows || 5–4 || Nagai (5–4) || Rios (2–6) || Koyama (3) || Meiji Jingu Stadium || 16,483 || 27–24–0 || W4
|-align="center" bgcolor="#ffbbbb
| 52 || May 28 || @ Giants || 1–6 || Utsumi (3–3) || Hasebe (0–1) || — || Tokyo Dome || 43,132 || 27–25–0 || L1
|-align="center" bgcolor="bbffbb"
| 53 || May 29 || @ Giants || 4–2 || Asai (5–5) || Greisinger (5–3) || Koyama (4) || Tokyo Dome || 41,106 || 28–25–0 || W1
|-align="center" bgcolor="bbffbb"
| 54 || May 31 || Carp || 8–3 || Iwakuma (8–2) || Takahashi (6–3) || — || Kleenex Stadium || 14,393 || 29–25–0 || W2
|-

|-
|  ||  ||  ||  ||  ||  ||  ||  || 
|-

|-
|  ||  ||  ||  ||  ||  ||  ||  || 
|-

|-
|  ||  ||  ||  ||  ||  ||  ||  || 
|-

|-
|  ||  ||  ||  ||  ||  ||  ||  || 
|-

|-
|  ||  ||  ||  ||  ||  ||  ||  || 
|-

|-
| Legend:       = Win       = Loss       = Tie       = PostponementBold = Eagles team member

Roster

Player statistics

Batting 

†Denotes player joined the team mid-season. Stats reflect time with the Eagles only.
‡Denotes player left the team mid-season. Stats reflect time with the Eagles only.
Bold/italics denotes best in the league

Pitching 

†Denotes player joined the team mid-season. Stats reflect time with the Eagles only.
‡Denotes player left the team mid-season. Stats reflect time with the Eagles only.
Bold/italics denotes best in the league

Awards and honors
Most Valuable Player Award
 Hisashi Iwakuma

Eiji Sawamura Award
 Hisashi Iwakuma

Nippon Life Monthly MVP Award
 Takeshi Yamasaki - March/April (batter)
 Hisashi Iwakuma - June (pitcher)
 Fernando Seguignol - September (batter)

Best Nine Award
 Hisashi Iwakuma - pitcher
 Rick Short - outfielder

Golden Spirit Award
 Hisashi Iwakuma

All-Star Series selections
 Hisashi Iwakuma - pitcher
 Masahiro Tanaka - pitcher
 Rick Short - infielder
 Takeshi Yamasaki - designated hitter

All-Star Series MVP
 Takeshi Yamasaki - Game 1

Nippon Life Award (Interleague play)
 Hisashi Iwakuma

Best Battery Award
 Hisashi Iwakuma and Akihito Fujii

JA Zen-Noh Go-Go Awards
Good Catch Award (July)
 Masato Nakamura (July 2)

Farm team

Nippon Professional Baseball draft

References

Tohoku Rakuten Golden Eagles
Tohoku Rakuten Golden Eagles seasons